Mecca Cafe is a restaurant in Seattle, in the U.S. state of Washington.

Description
Mecca Cafe is a diner and dive bar in Seattle's Lower Queen Anne. The menu has included burgers and sandwiches. According to Lonely Planet, "Half of the long, skinny room at Mecca Café is a ketchup-on-the-table diner, but all the fun happens on the other side, where decades worth of beer mat scribbles line the walls and the bartenders know the jukebox songs better than you do."

History
Mecca Cafe is among Seattle's oldest continuously operating bars. C. Preston and Frances Smith opened the restaurant in 1930. Mecca Cafe remained in the family until 2001. David Meinert later purchased the business.

See also

 List of diners
 List of dive bars

References

External links
 
 Mecca Cafe at Zomato

1930 establishments in Washington (state)
Diners in Washington (state)
Dive bars in Washington (state)
Drinking establishments in Washington (state)
Queen Anne, Seattle
Restaurants established in 1930
Restaurants in Seattle